The Hunt House is a historic residence in Griffin, Spalding County, Georgia.  Also known at the Chapman-Kincaid-Hunt House, it was added to the National Register of Historic Places in 1973. It was originally located at 232 South 8th Street.

It is a monumental Beaux Arts house that was built originally in c.1860 as an Italianate summer home for a rich south Georgia planter, W.W. Chapman.

It was remodelled into the Beaux Arts style by W.J. Kincaid, founder of a textile manufacturing firm in Griffin. Kincaid bought the house in 1874. His daughter, born in the house in 1875, married a Hunt and lived there until 1959.

See also
National Register of Historic Places listings in Spalding County, Georgia

References

External links
Hunt House Ryan-Gluesing.com

Buildings and structures in Griffin, Georgia
Houses on the National Register of Historic Places in Georgia (U.S. state)